Asaphodes chlorocapna is a species of moth in the family Geometridae. This species is endemic to New Zealand and can only be found in the Chatham Islands. The larvae of this species consume the leaves of Muehlenbeckia plants. Adults are on the wing in January. This species is classified as "At Risk, Relict'" by the Department of Conservation.

Taxonomy
This species was first described by Edward Meyrick in 1925 as Xanthorhoe chlorocapna using a specimen collected by Stewart Lindsay at Mangere Island, in the Chatham Islands. George Hudson discussed and illustrated the species in 1928 using the name Xanthorhoe chlorocapna. In 1987 R. C. Craw placed this species within the genus Asaphodes. The holotype specimen is held at the Canterbury Museum.

Description

Meyrick described the species as follows:

Distribution
This species is endemic to New Zealand. It can only be found in the Chatham Islands where it can be found on Mangere Island, Pitt Island and Rangatira Island.

Biology and life cycle 
Adult moths are on the wing in January.

Host plants and habitat 
The larvae of this moth consume the fallen leaves of Muehlenbeckia species.

Conservation status 
This moth is classified under the New Zealand Threat Classification system as being "At Risk, Relict".

References

Moths described in 1925
Moths of New Zealand
Larentiinae
Endemic fauna of New Zealand
Endangered biota of New Zealand
Fauna of the Chatham Islands
Taxa named by Edward Meyrick
Endemic moths of New Zealand